Trupanea aucta is a species of tephritid or fruit flies in the genus Pliomelaena of the family Tephritidae.

Distribution
India, Sri Lanka.

References

Tephritinae
Insects described in 1913
Diptera of Asia